Chenareh is a city in Kurdistan Province, Iran.

Chenareh may also refer to:

Chenar-e Pain
Chenareh, Kermanshah
Chenareh-ye Ali Madad, Kermanshah Province
Chenareh-ye Latif, Kermanshah Province
Chenareh-ye Majid, Kermanshah Province
Chenareh, Sanandaj, Kurdistan Province
Chenareh, Saqqez, Kurdistan Province
Chenareh, Lorestan
Chenareh-ye Olya
Chenareh-ye Sofla